Foss River Falls is a  drop on the West Fork Foss River in the Alpine Lakes Wilderness Area, King County, Washington. Its sources are at Delta Lake, and the -wide drop flows year-round. The waterfall is split into two parts. Each part is split into several tiers.

The upper section starts off by plunging , then cascades , then spits and drops  over a plunge and a horsetail. Then the waters gather and plunge over a  drop, and then cascade 150 more feet (46 m) down the gorge.

See also
Waterfalls of the West Fork Foss River Valley

References

Waterfalls of King County, Washington
Waterfalls of Washington (state)
Tiered waterfalls